The governor of Albay is the chief executive of the provincial government of Albay, Philippines. Like all local government heads in the Philippines, the governor is elected via popular vote, and may not be elected for a fourth consecutive term (although the former governor may return to office after an interval of one term). In case of death, resignation or incapacity, the vice governor becomes the governor.

The current governor is Edcel Greco Lagman, who has been assuming the post since 2022 through the line of succession. He previously served as provincial vice-governor (2019–2022).

List of governors of Albay

References

Governors of provinces of the Philippines
Politics of Albay